Menabitan (INN; SP-204), or menabitan hydrochloride (USAN), is a synthetic drug which acts as a potent cannabinoid receptor agonist. It is closely related to natural cannabinoids of the tetrahydrocannabinol (THC) group, differing mainly by its longer and branched side chain, and the replacement of the 9-position carbon with a  nitrogen. It was studied as an analgesic in the 1970s and was found to possess antinociceptive effects in both humans and animals but was never marketed.

Due to its structural similarity to the schedule I/III drug THC it can be treated as a schedule I drug within the United States legal system under the Federal Analogue Act.

See also 
 A-40174 (SP-1)
 Dimethylheptylpyran

References 

Analgesics
Carboxylate esters
Cannabinoids
Piperidines
Tetrahydropyridines
Benzopyrans